Kurgwi is a town in the Middle belt of Nigeria.It is found in Qua'an pan Local Government Area of Plateau State. The town sits along the Shendam-Lafia highway in the southern part of plateau state.

Education 
The town is an educational and peaceful town with numerous secondary and primary schools and the famous College of Arts, Sciences and Technology (CAST) which is located in the town and has led to the development of modern infrastructures hitherto not present in the town before the coming of the tertiary institution.

References 

Populated places in Plateau State